Max Andersson may refer to:

 Max Andersson (cartoonist) (born 1962), Swedish cartoonist
 Max Andersson (politician) (born 1973), Swedish politician

See also
Max Anderson (disambiguation)